The China Theatre Plum Blossom Award, more commonly the Plum Blossom Award, is the highest theatrical award in China. It is awarded by the China Theatre Association.

Several Taiwanese have also won the award, such as Wei Hai-min.

History
The Plum Blossom Award was founded in 1983 by Liu Housheng, Vice President of the China Theatre Association, and his colleagues.

In 1994, the China Theatre Association began awarding Second Plum Blossom Prizes to distinguished performers who had already won the prize once. In 2002, the Association began the policy of awarding the Plum Blossom Grand Prize to performers who had won the prize twice previously and continued to be active and innovative in the field.  There have been four winners of that award to date: Shang Changrong in 2002, Song Guofeng and Mao Weitao in 2007, and Pei Yanling in 2009. The Plum Blossom Prize has been awarded every two years since 2005, as opposed to every year as it was previously. Due to the promulgation of the "Administration of Art, Journalism, and Publishing Awards" circular by the Ministry of Culture in 2005, the number of such awards was reduced, and the Plum Blossom Prize was combined with another prize. Beginning in 2009, the selection process for the Plum Blossom Prize was changed into a televised competition among fifty hopefuls.

Controversy
In 1992, actress Song Dandan refused to accept the Plum Blossom Prize that she had been awarded because of what she called "the scandal of corruption and lies behind the selection process".

Recipients

Western genres
1984 (1st)
Spoken theatre: Li Xuejian, Shang Lijuan, Liu Wenzhi, Feng Xianzhen, Jiang Baoying
1985 (2nd)
Spoken theatre: Zhou Ling, Su Jinbang, Li Bangyu, Liang Yan, Luo Lige
Opera: Ji Xiaoqin, Pang Xinhua
1986 (3rd)
Spoken theatre: Wang Ling, Ding Jiali, Zhang Jiazhao, Shan Zenghong
Opera: Peng Liyuan, Li Xiaohu
1987 (4th)
Spoken theatre: Lü Xiaohe, Wang Yu, Liang Guanhua, Zhang Guoli, Wen Yujuan
Opera: Yang Hongji
1988 (5th)
Spoken theatre: Xi Meijuan, Song Guofeng, Ye Mang, Han Tongsheng, Zhang Qiuge
Opera: Liu Weiwei
1989 (6th)
Spoken theatre: Liu Yuan, Wei Zi, Song Jie, Li Fang, Lu Zhiqi
Opera: Wan Shanhong, Guo Weimin
1990 (7th)
Spoken theatre: Jia Zhanhong, Zhang Zhizhong, Yang Qing, Wei Ji'an, Tan Zongyao
Opera: Zhang Jimin, Chen Su'e
1991 (8th)
Spoken theatre: Liu Xiaoming
1992 (9th)
Spoken theatre: Ning Cai, Li Qi, Yang Shutian, Wu Shanshan, Song Dandan, Zhong Hao, Xia Jun, Zhai Wanchen, Pu Cunxin
Opera: Jin Man, Gu Xin, Tang Dejun
1993 (10th)
Spoken theatre: Wang Liyun, Wang Xueqi, Wang Xiaomei, Liu Yan, Jia Lingzhen
Opera: Mi Dongfeng, Qin Lufeng
1994 (11th)
Spoken theatre: Zhu Yin, Zhou Hong, Ma Lu, Lu Liang
Opera: An Jinyu
1995 (12th)
Spoken theatre: Zhang Jiumei, Zhao Liang, Wang Lihua, Cai Jinping
Opera: Lei Yan
1996 (13th)
Spoken theatre: Yang Shuquan, Xu Fan, Xia Zhiqing, Yang Niansheng, Wang Yanbo
Opera: Han Yanwen
1997 (14th)
Spoken theatre: Yin Zhusheng, Tashi Dondrup, Liu Meihua, Wu Jing'an, Qi Lihua
Opera: Che Ying, Sun Liying, Yao Hong
Dance: Zhang Dandan
1998 (15th)
Spoken theatre: Zhang Teng, Ning Xiaozhi, Zhang Lijun, Zhang Yechuan, Zhang Jinyuan
Opera: Cheng Guilan, Li Caiqin
Dance: Liu Jing, Yang Xia, Jin Baolong, Shan Chong, Zhao Qing
1999 (16th)
Spoken theatre: Li Shanshan, Yang Chunrong, Li Jinghui, He Bing
Opera: Wang Jing
2000 (17th)
Spoken theatre: Song Guofeng (2nd win), Ding Jiali (2nd win), Ni Dahong, Wu Jun, Sun Honglei, Sun Haiying, Kang Aishi, Wang Yao, Zhang Zhizhong, Li Lan, Ma Xiaomao, Xiao Hong
Opera: Sun Yi, Li Haizhen, Chen Shumin
2001 (18th)
Spoken theatre: Liang Guanhua (2nd win), Wang Hong, Wu Yanlin, Yin Yanping, Wen Liqin, Wang Weiguo, Zhang Kaili, Leng Jiahua
2002 (19th)
Spoken theatre: Pu Cunxin (2nd win), Zhang Teng (2nd win), Chen Xiguang, Qiang Yin, Tian Shui, Xiao Xiong, Ding Xiaohan, Wang Yang, Gao Xia, Jia Yulan, Zhang Lu
Opera: Wang Hui
Musical: Zheng Qiang  
2003 (20th)
Spoken theatre: Yang Lixin, Zhang Fengyi, Zhu Heng, Zeng Yongjun, Yao Jude
Opera: Liu Yanyan
2004 (21st)
Spoken theatre: He Bing (2nd win), Wang Xiaoying
Opera: Dai Yuqiang
2005 (22nd)
Spoken theatre: Feng Yuanzheng, Hao Ping, Wang Xiaoling, Hou Bingyu
Opera: Sun Jian, Liu Danli
Musical: Song Zuying
2007 (23rd)
Spoken theatre: Feng Xianzhen (2nd win), Sun Tao
Opera: Lü Jihong
2009 (24th)
Spoken theatre: Ai Ping, Liu Xiaocui
Opera: Zhang Lihui
2011 (25th)
Spoken theatre: Feng Ruili
2013 (26th)
Spoken theatre: Zhang Qiuge (2nd win), Yuan Quan, Zhang Yanqiu, Wang Ban
Opera: Chen Xiaoduo
2015 (27th)
Spoken theatre: Zhu Heng (2nd win), Hou Yansong, Guo Guangping, Tang Yan
Opera: Du Huan
2017 (28th)
Spoken theatre: Zhao Xu
2019 (29th)
Spoken theatre: Xin Baiqing
Opera: Lei Jia

Peking opera

Kunqu

Henan opera

Yue opera

Qinqiang

Sichuan opera

Ping opera

Cantonese opera

Hebei bangzi

Shanxi opera

Huangmei opera

Pu opera

Other genres
Flower-drum opera: Liu Zhaoqian (1992), Hu Xinzhong (1997), Li Chunhua (1998), Cai Jianting (2000), Zeng Ju (2007), Ye Hong (2017)
Wuxi opera: Ni Tongfang (1993), Xiao Wang Binbin (1996), Zhou Dongliang (2002), Chen Yunxia (2002), Huang Jinghui (2009), Dong Hong (2013)
Chu opera: Yu Shengle (1986), Liu Danli (1997), Peng Qinglian (2003), Xia Qingling (2011), Zhan Chunyao (2013)
Han opera: Deng Min (1989), Hu Heyan (1991), Qiu Ling (1992), Peng Ling (2005), Wang Li (2015)
Xiang opera: Zuo Dabin (1989), Wang Yongguang (1991), He Xiaohan (1993), Cao Rulong (1996), Wang Yangjuan (2000)
Shangdang bangzi: Wu Guohua (1992), Zhang Aizhen (1992), Zhang Baoping (1999), Chen Suqin (2002), Du Jianping (2015)
Min opera: Chen Naichun (1993), Chen Hongxiang (2005), Zhou Hong (2007), Chen Qiong (2011), Wu Zewen (2017)
Huai opera: Liang Weiping (1994), Liang Guoying (1996), Wang Shulong (2003), Chen Cheng (2004), Chen Mingkuang (2015)
Shanghai opera: Mao Shanyu (1985, 2013), Hua Wen (1987, 2015), Chen Yu (1992), Ma Lili (1994)
Dian opera: Wang Yuzhen (1992), Zhou Weihua (1999), Feng Yongmei (2000), Chen Yaping (2013)
Yan opera: Yang Zhongyi (1993), Cheng Fengying (1997), Jia Fentao (1998), Zhang Caiping (2003)
Tea-picking opera: Zhang Manjun (1994), Long Hong (1994), Zhao Yiqing (1997), Yang Jun (2015)
Hui opera: Li Longbin (1994), Dong Cheng (1998), Wang Danhong (2011), Wang Yushu (2017)
Qu opera: Xu Di (1997), Zhang Shaorong (2000), Yang Shuaixue (2003), Fang Suzhen (2005)
Long opera: Lei Tongxia (1999), Bian Xiao (2004), Tong Hongmei (2013), Dou Fengxia (2015)
Lü opera: Gao Jing (2000), Liu Yufeng (2001), Jiao Li (2007), Lü Shu'e (2013)
Wu opera: Chen Meilan (1989, 2007), Zhang Jianmin (1997), Yang Xiayun (2015)
Meihu opera: Xu Aiying (1990), Yan Huifang (2007), Pan Guoliang (2009)
Lantern opera: Yang Liqiong (1998), Li Danyu (2003), Shao Zhiqing (2007)
Shao opera: Zhao Xiuzhi (1999), Yao Baiqing (2013), Shi Jiejing (2015)
Teochew opera: Chen Xuexi (2001), Zhang Yihuang (2007), Lin Yanyun (2019)
Yangzhou opera: Xu Xiufang (2002), Li Zhengcheng (2004), Gong Lili (2017)
Qiong opera: Chen Suzhen (2007), Fu Chuanjie (2015), Lin Chuanmei (2019)
Huajixi: Gu Xiang (1992, 1998, 2011), Zhang Keqin (1989)
Wuyin opera: Huo Junping (1988, 2002), Lü Fengqin (2009)
Longjiang opera: Bai Shuxian (1991, 1995), Li Xuefei (2011)
Hakka opera: Li Xianhua (1994, 2001), Yang Xiuwei (1999)
Gan opera: Tu Linghui (1987), Chen Li (1991)
Gui opera: Su Guozhang (1991), Zhang Shuping (2002)
Jiangsu bangzi: Zhang Hong (1992), Yan Ling (2001)
Gaojia opera: Wu Jingjing (2004), Chen Juanjuan (2011)
Liuqin opera: Wang Xiaohong (2005), Liu Lili (2015)
Huaihai opera: Wei Jianing (2007), Xu Yaling (2011)
Liyuan opera: Zeng Jingping (1989, 2007)
Huanglong opera: Ma Zhongqin (1991)
Xincheng opera: Liu Haibo (1993)
Manhan opera: Zhang Fenglian (1993)
Shangdang laozi: Guo Ming'e (1996)
Wanwanqiang: Zhang Jianqin (1999)
Puxian opera: Wang Shaoyuan (2000)
Errentai: Wu Liping (2002)
Lei opera: Lin Fen (2002)
Bai opera: Yang Yikun (2002)
Yong opera: Wang Jinwen (2003)
Yuediao: Shen Xiaomei (2004)
Liuzi opera: Chen Yuan (2005)
Taiwanese opera: Su Yanrong (2009)
Beilu bangzi: Zhan Lihua (2011)
Qi opera: Xiao Xiaobo (2011)
Pingdiao opera: Wang Hong (2013)
Ou opera: Fang Rujiang (2013)
Lhamo: Palden Wangchuk (2013)
Zhuang opera: Ha Dan (2019)

References

Theatre acting awards
Chinese opera